Colace is the trade name for Docusate, the pharmaceutical compound dioctyl sulfosuccinate (DOSS), a laxative.

Colace may also refer to:

People
 Hugo Colace (disambiguation), several people
 The Bella Twins (born 1983), the Garcia Colace twin sister pro-wrestlers
 Brie Bella (born 1983, as Brianna Monique Garcia Colace) twin pro-wrestler
 Nikki Bella (born 1983, as Stephanie Nicole Garcia Colace) twin pro-wrestler
 Kathy Colace, mother of The Bella Twins, wife of John Laurinaitis

See also

 
 Lace (disambiguation)